Sailing at the 1951 Pan American Games was held at Buenos Aires in March 1951. Equipment classes were the Snipe dinghy and the Star keelboat. Argentina and Brazil finished one-two in the Snipe class, and the order was reversed for the Stars. The United States did not compete in the regatta.


Open events

References

 
 

1951
Events at the 1951 Pan American Games
Pan American Games
1951 Pan American Games